Ira E. Inman (December 7, 1868 – December 1, 1954) was an American farmer and politician.

Born in the Town of Plymouth, Rock County, Wisconsin, Inman was a farmer and raised brown Swiss cattle. From 1933 to 1937, Inman served in the Wisconsin State Assembly and was a Republican. From 1942 until 1951, he served on the Wisconsin Board of Agriculture and was chairman. Inman died at his home in Beloit, Wisconsin.

Notes

1868 births
1954 deaths
People from Rock County, Wisconsin
Farmers from Wisconsin
Republican Party members of the Wisconsin State Assembly